The Tonkawa massacre (October 23–24, 1862) occurred after an attack at the Confederate held Wichita Agency, located at Fort Cobb (south of present-day Fort Cobb, Oklahoma) near Anadarko in Oklahoma, when the Tonkawa's long hated enemy detected weakness at Fort Cobb due to the civil war and attacked the agency, home to 300 members of the Tonkawa, a tribe sympathetic to the Confederacy. During the attack on the Confederate-held agency, the Confederate Indian agent Matthew Leeper and several other whites were killed. In response to this attack the Tonkawa fled southward toward Confederate held Fort Arbuckle. However, before they could reach the safety of the fort they were caught on October 24. In the resulting massacre, the estimates of Tonkawa dead were 137 men, women and children, among them Chief Ha-shu-ka-na ("Can't Kill Him"). It was claimed that the Tonkawa were roasted alive and eaten by the Comanche. There are varying accounts of the tribes involved in the massacre with the Osage, Shawnee, Caddo, Comanche, Kiowa, Wichita and Seminole being named in some accounts.

The reasons for the attack are varied with some suggesting that the Tonkawa had killed and eaten two Shawnees, and that they were responsible for the death and dismemberment of a young Caddo boy, as the Tonkawa were rumored to be cannibalistic. Other accounts name the main reason as their being allied to the Confederacy. The relations between the Tonkawa and neighboring tribes had been antagonistic for years for a variety of reasons including the Tonkawa acting as scouts for the Texas Rangers, and fighting alongside them in actions against hostile tribes including the Comanche.

Many of the survivors fled to Confederate held Fort Arbuckle after the massacre, base of the pro-Confederate Chickasaw Battalion, then made their way to Confederate-held Fort Belknap in Texas in 1863. The massacre completely demoralized and fractured the remnants of the tribe, who remained without a leader and lived in squalor by Fort Belknap. The remnants of the tribe then lived near Fort Griffin in Texas until 1884. They were then forced by the government to relocate temporarily to the Sac-Fox agency and then in the spring of 1885 to Fort Oakland, occupied by Chief Joseph's Band of Nez Perce from 1878 to 1885. The population on the reservation in 2011 was 537 with 481 being officially on the tribal rolls.

Notes

References

Further reading
Connole, Joseph. "A Terrible Truth: Tonkawa Massacre of 1862" Chronciles of Oklahoma, Vol. 99, Issue Winter 2019/20202 (2020) pp. 450-467
 Hodge, Frederick Webb, editor, Handbook of American Indians North of Mexico (2 vols.), Washington: GPO, 1907, 1910; reprint., New York: Pageant, 1959.
  May, Jon D. "Tonkawa", Encyclopedia of Oklahoma History & Culture.  Oklahoma Historical Society.] 
 Newcomb, William W., The Indians of Texas. Austin: University of Texas Press, 1961.

History of Texas
Union war crimes
1862 in North America
Native American tribes in Texas
Tonkawa history
Military operations of the American Civil War in Indian Territory
Massacres by Native Americans
Massacres of the American Civil War
October 1862 events
1862 murders in the United States